Nic Stene (25 May 1921 – 20 May 2006) was a Norwegian speed skater, born in Trondheim.  He competed at the 1952 Winter Olympics in Oslo, where he placed 15th in the 1,500 m.

References

External links

1921 births
2006 deaths
Norwegian male speed skaters
Olympic speed skaters of Norway
Speed skaters at the 1952 Winter Olympics
Sportspeople from Trondheim